Varner is an unincorporated community in Lincoln County, Arkansas, United States.  Its elevation is 177 ft (54 m). Varner is located southeast of Little Rock.

History
Circa 1952 Varner had three residents.

Circa 1958 Varner, which had five residents, had a crossroads, gas station and a store.

By 1975, parts of the area were within the boundary of the Cummins Unit. The center of the community is now entirely in ADC land.

Government and infrastructure
The Cummins/Varner Volunteer Fire Department provides fire services. The station is along Arkansas Highway 388.

Varner houses the Arkansas Department of Correction Varner Unit. The Cummins Unit is located nearby. The main campus of the Riverside Vocational Technical School is located behind the Varner Unit.

Education
In 1952 the area was zoned to the Grady School District.

References

Unincorporated communities in Lincoln County, Arkansas
Unincorporated communities in Arkansas